Elton-Ofoi Acolatse (born 25 July 1995) is a Dutch professional footballer who plays as a winger for Israeli club F.C. Ashdod. Besides the Netherlands, he has played in Belgium, Israel and Turkey.

Club career

Ajax
Born in Amsterdam to Ghanaian parents, Acolatse joined the Ajax Youth Academy in 2003. He played for the under-19 Ajax A1 team during the 2012–13 season. On 27 April 2012, Acolatse signed a three-year contract with Ajax, tying him down to the club until 30 June 2015. He made his professional debut for the reserves team Jong Ajax, starting in a 4–0 away defeat to FC Emmen in Eerste Divisie on 17 January 2014. He was substituted off in the 60th minute for Vincent Vermeij.

Westerlo
On 21 July 2016, it was announced that Acolatse had signed a three-year contract with Belgian club K.V.C. Westerlo. On 31 July 2016, he made his debut for Westerlo on the first matchday of the season against Standard Liège. The match ended in a 2–2 draw with Acolatse scoring the 1–1 equaliser after 30 minutes.

Club Brugge
On 5 April 2017, it was announced that Club Brugge had signed Acolatse to a four-year contract, joining the club on a free transfer from KVC Westerlo.

Sint-Truiden
He only spent one season contracted to Brugge, when he was on loan to Sint-Truiden. He then joined the club permanently.

Hapoel Be'er Sheva
After two years at Sint-Truiden, Acolatse moved to Hapoel Be'er Sheva of Israel on loan, with an option for the club to buy him. He scored his debut goal against Motherwell in the Europa League third qualifying round. In the 2020–21 Europa League group stage, he scored two goals in the 86th and 88th minutes respectively (including one from the middle of the field) as his side defeated Slavia Prague 3–1.

Career statistics

Club

Honours
Hapoel Beer Sheva
 Israeli State Cup: 2019–20

Netherlands U17
 UEFA European Under-17 Football Championship: 2012

References

External links
 Netherlands stats at OnsOranje
 

1995 births
Living people
Footballers from Amsterdam
Dutch sportspeople of Ghanaian descent
Association football wingers
Dutch footballers
AFC Ajax players
Jong Ajax players
K.V.C. Westerlo players
Club Brugge KV players
Sint-Truidense V.V. players
Hapoel Be'er Sheva F.C. players
Bursaspor footballers
F.C. Ashdod players
Eerste Divisie players
Belgian Pro League players
Israeli Premier League players
TFF First League players
Netherlands youth international footballers
Dutch expatriate footballers
Expatriate footballers in Belgium
Expatriate footballers in Israel
Expatriate footballers in Turkey
Dutch expatriate sportspeople in Belgium
Dutch expatriate sportspeople in Israel
Dutch expatriate sportspeople in Turkey